The Multnomah Athletic Club is a private social and athletic club in Portland, Oregon, United States.

Located in the Goose Hollow neighborhood, it was originally founded in 1891 as the Multnomah Amateur Athletic Club. It has expanded to fill two buildings totaling , making it the largest indoor athletic club in the world. Its emblem is a winged "M".  It has approximately 22,000 members and employs nearly 600 staff, according to the club's website.

The club is known for its exclusivity. It has been called "the only club in town that matters" and Nike had paid for one of its former executive's MAC membership on company expense to "help him integrate into the Portland business community" Women members were not given full voting privileges until 1977. New memberships are chosen by a lottery, however applicants who don't know a current member maybe asked to present a reference letter.

Facilities 

The club's primary facility is an eight-level main clubhouse located adjacent to Providence Park, a multipurpose stadium located on land formerly owned by the club, directly behind the park's south end bleachers.  Covered parking for more than 600 autos is provided across the street in the club's garage which has a skybridge connecting across the road to the rest of the facilities.

Athletic facilities at the club include:
Nine tennis courts,
Eight squash courts,
Ten racquetball/handball courts,
Gymnastics arena,
Three gymnasiums including a rock climbing gym,
Indoor track,
Batting cage,
Pilates studio,
Three fitness studios with  total space, and
Four locker rooms with over 6400 lockers.
The club also has three swimming pools, two with spectator galleries.

Premier Dining facilities include four restaurants, ten private dining rooms and the grand ballroom.
Areas for socializing include reading lounge, game room, stadium terrace, sun deck, and junior lounge.
Amenities include concierge, the -M-porium retail shop, child care and playschool, salon, massage, and shoe shine/repair.

The club offers a swim team, synchronized swimming, basketball, cycling, dance, decathlon, golf, gymnastics, handball, karate, Pilates, personal training, skiing, squash, soccer, tennis, triathlon, volleyball, hiking, and yoga.  The clubhouse is also host to a variety of local, regional, and national sporting competitions throughout the year, and has been a venue for international championships on more than one occasion.

References

External links

Multnomah Athletic Club (official website)

Athletics clubs in the United States
Clubs and societies in Oregon
Sports in Portland, Oregon
Gentlemen's clubs in the United States
Sports organizations established in 1891
1891 establishments in Oregon
Civic organizations in Oregon
Goose Hollow, Portland, Oregon